The 1884 Democratic National Convention was held July 8–11, 1884 and chose Governor Grover Cleveland of New York their presidential nominee with the former Governor Thomas A. Hendricks of Indiana as the vice presidential nominee.

Background 
The leading candidate for the presidential nomination was New York Governor Grover Cleveland. Cleveland's reputation for good government made him a national figure. The Republican Party nominated James G. Blaine for president in June 1884, although he had been implicated in a financial scandal. Many influential Republicans were outraged, thought the time had come for a national reform administration and withdrew from the convention. These Republicans were called mugwumps, and declared that they would vote for the Democratic candidate based on his integrity.

Presidential nomination

Candidates 

Seven names were placed in nomination: Grover Cleveland, Thomas F. Bayard, Allen G. Thurman, Samuel J. Randall, Joseph E. McDonald, John G. Carlisle, and George Hoadly.

Thomas A. Hendricks professed that he was not a candidate for the presidential nomination. When a delegate from Illinois cast the only vote he received on the first ballot, Hendricks rose to ask this vote be withdrawn because it "wrongly" placed him before the convention. Nonetheless, Hendricks made an impressive showing on the second ballot but it was not enough to prevent the nomination of Cleveland.

Source: US President - D Convention. Our Campaigns. (August 26, 2009).

Vice Presidential nomination 
Hendricks, who was the 1876 Democratic vice presidential nominee, was offered the 1884 nomination and accepted.

Vice Presidential candidate

Withdrawn candidates 

Thomas A. Hendricks of Indiana was overwhelmingly nominated as the Democratic vice-presidential candidate after the names of John C. Black, George W. Glick, Joseph E. McDonald, and William Rosecrans were withdrawn from consideration.

Source: US Vice President - D Convention. Our Campaigns. (August 26, 2009).

See also 
 Grover Cleveland 1884 presidential campaign
 History of the United States Democratic Party
 U.S. presidential nomination convention
 1884 Republican National Convention
 List of Democratic National Conventions
 1884 United States presidential election

Footnotes

Further reading 

 Edward B. Dickinson (ed.), Official Proceedings of the National Democratic Convention Held in Chicago, Ill., July 8th, 9th, 10th, and 11th, 1884. New York: Douglas Taylor's Democratic Printing House, n.d. [1884].
 Nevins, Allan. Grover Cleveland: A Study in Courage (1932) online.

Primary sources 
 Chester, Edward W A guide to political platforms (1977) pp 109–114 online

External links 
 Democratic Party Platform of 1884 at The American Presidency Project

1884 conferences
1884 United States presidential election
1884 in Illinois
1880s in Chicago
Political conventions in Chicago
Democratic Party of Illinois
Political events in Illinois
Democratic National Conventions
July 1884 events